Verheul is a Dutch toponymic surname.  Notable people with the surname include:

Carly Verheul (born 1980), Dutch cricketer
Jan Verheul (1860–1948), Dutch architect
 (born 1940, Dutch Slavist

Dutch-language surnames
Toponymic surnames